Vernonia duvigneaudii is a species of flowering plant in the family Asteraceae. It is native to Congo.

References

duvigneaudii